The 1935 Northwestern Wildcats team represented Northwestern University during the 1935 college football season. In their fifth year under head coach Pappy Waldorf, the Wildcats compiled a 4–3–1 record (2–3–1 against Big Ten Conference opponents) and finished in fifth place in the Big Ten Conference.

On October 5, Northwestern hosted the first night game in Big Ten history, losing 7–0 against Purdue before a crowd of 30,000 persons.

Schedule

References

Northwestern
Northwestern Wildcats football seasons
Northwestern Wildcats football